Yoshiki Hiki (28 July 1933 – 14 October 2022) was a Japanese rower. He competed in the men's eight event at the 1956 Summer Olympics.

References

1933 births
2022 deaths
Japanese male rowers
Olympic rowers of Japan
Rowers at the 1956 Summer Olympics
Place of birth missing (living people)